Ben or Benjamin Griffin may refer to:

 Ben Griffin (British Army soldier) (born 1977), former British SAS soldier and anti-war activist
 Ben Griffin (soccer) (born 1986), Australian football (soccer) player
 Ben Hill Griffin Jr. (1910–1990), Florida politician
 Benjamin Griffin (actor) (1680–1740), dramatist and actor
 Benjamin Griffin (alpine skier) (born 1986), New Zealand skier
 Benjamin S. Griffin (born 1946), U.S. Army general